Dorothy Morrison (born May 6, 1955) is an author and teacher in the fields of magic, Wicca and Neo-Paganism. She is a Third Degree Wiccan High Priestess of the Georgian Tradition, and founded the Coven of the Crystal Garden in 1986. She is a member of the Coven of the Raven, and studies the RavenMyst Circle Tradition. Originally from Texas, she is an expert archer, a former staff writer for several bow-hunting magazines, and winner of three State Championship titles (Arkansas, Tennessee and Illinois). She has also been an administrator for the Humane Society. She is a member of the Pagan Poets Society and a charter member of M.A.G.I.C., a magical writers and artists organization. Her work has been published in many journals and magazines, including Circle Network News, SageWoman, and Crone Chronicles. She presently lives in Northern Virginia with her husband Mark.

Bibliography
 Bud, Blossom & Leaf: The Magical Herb Gardener's Handbook (2001) Llewellyn Publications , 
 The Craft: A Witch's Book of Shadows (2001) Llewellyn Publications , 
 The Craft Companion: A Witch's Journal (2001) Llewellyn Publications , 
 Dancing the Goddess Incarnate: Living the Magic of Maiden, Mother & Crone with Kristin Madden (2006) Llewellyn Publications  , 
 Enchantments of the Heart: A Magical Guide to Finding the Love of Your Life (2002) Career Books , 
 Everyday Magic: Spells & Rituals for Modern Living (2002) Llewellyn Publications , 
 Everyday Moon Magic: Spells & Rituals for Abundant Living (2004) Llewellyn Publications , 
 Everyday Sun Magic: Spells & Rituals for Radiant Living (2005) Llewellyn Publications , 
 Everyday Tarot Magic: Meditation & Spells (2003) Llewellyn Publications , 
 In Praise of the Crone (1999) Llewellyn Publications , 
 Magical Needlework (2002) Llewellyn Publications , 
 Yule: A Celebration of Light and Warmth (2000) Llewellyn Publications , 
 Whimsical Tarot Deck/Book Set with Book (2000) U.S. Games Systems ,

Articles and interviews
 The Craft: A Witch's Book of Shadows - Interview with Dorothy Morrison Wiccan/Pagan Times
   Interview with Dorothy Morrison 2007
   Radio interview with Dorothy Morrison

References

External links
 Official website
 Llewelyn Publications website
 Coven of the Raven - A Wiccan Coven based out of Flint Michigan in Genesee County

1955 births
Living people
American occult writers
American Wiccans